Tahúres zurdos (Left-handed Gamblers) was a Spanish band active from 1987 to 2004.

Its members were Aurora Beltrán Gila (voice, composition and guitar), Manuel Beltrán Gila (Lolo Beltrán, Aurora's brother, guitarist), Luis salcedo (until 1990, bass), Juan Manuel Ugarte (from 1990 on, bass), Javier Lizarazu (alias Punxes, drummer).

They were influenced by The Who, Led Zeppelin, David Bowie, and Lou Reed

Lolo and Aurora come from a mining village near Pamplona called Potasa. The members of the band started with small performances in the Basque Country, Navarre and others places in the north of Spain.

With 40,000 pesetas, they recorded a demo which would become their first, self-entitled album.

After the relative success of their two first albums, they signed with record companies like EMI or Sony.

They split up in 2004 after 17 years in active.

Discography
Tahúres zurdos, 1988 Ohiuka
Tahuría, 1990 Ohiuka
Nieve negra, 1991 EMI
Árido, 1992 EMI
La caza, 1994 EMI
Azul, BMG-ARIOLA
Tak, 1998 Arcade Records
Acústico de la Cadena Ser
El tiempo de la luz, 2000 SONY
17 Años, 2004 Do It Records

External links
Información general del grupo
Información general del grupo

Spanish musical groups